Bossiaea sericea is a species of flowering plant in the family Fabaceae and is endemic to higher areas of south-eastern continental Australia. It is an erect shrub with more or less round to heart-shaped leaves with the narrower end towards the base, and yellow flowers.

Description
The upper surface of the leaves is more or less glabrous but the lower surface is covered with fine white hairs.

Taxonomy
Bossiaea sericea was first formally described in 2012 by Ian R. Thompson in the journal Muelleria from specimens collected by Robert Owen Makinson on 3 December 1991 near Omeo. The specific epithet (sericea) is derived from the Latin, sericeus (silky) and refers to the silky undersurface of the leaves.

Distribution and habitat 
This bossiaea is found in north-eastern and far eastern Victoria, far south-eastern New South Wales, and in the Australian Capital Territory, growing in alpine and subalpine areas at altitudes above , growing in heath and woodland (often bordered by grassland).

References

External links
Images (Flickr: Friends of Chiltern: Bossiaea sericea)

sericea
Flora of Victoria (Australia)
Flora of the Australian Capital Territory
Flora of New South Wales
Plants described in 2012
Taxa named by Ian R. Thompson